Wilbur Clifford "Jack" Riley (January 4, 1903 – April 30, 1954) was an American football coach, athletic administrator, and teacher.

Riley was born in Scott City, Kansas, in 1903. He attended Kansas State Teachers College of Hays located in Hays, Kansas, where he received varsity letters in both football and basketball. He also played varsity baseball at Hays.

After graduating from college, Riley coached high school football in Oberlin, Kansas for five years from 1925 to 1929.

In 1930, he became the eighth head football coach at Kansas State Teachers College of Hays. He held that position for five seasons, from 1930 until 1934.  His career coaching record at Hays was 21–19–6.  This ranks him sixth at Hays in total wins and ninth at Hays in winning percentage. His 1934 football team won the Central Intercollegiate Athletic Conference (CIAC) championship with a 6–2–1 record. He was also the athletic director while at Hays. The school's name was changed to Fort Hays State College in 1931.

In September 1935, Riley joined the faculty of The Hill School in Pottstown, Pennsylvania, where he served at various times as football and baseball coach, athletic director, and an instructor in history and Bible. In November 1952, Riley suffered a heart attack while coaching a football game. He retired from athletic duties after suffering the heart attack, but remained at The Hill School as an instructor. He died in 1954 upon suffering his second heart attack in 16 months.

Head coaching record

References

External links
 

1903 births
1954 deaths
20th-century American educators
American men's basketball players
Fort Hays State Tigers athletic directors
Fort Hays State Tigers baseball players
Fort Hays State Tigers football coaches
Fort Hays State Tigers football players
Fort Hays State Tigers men's basketball players
High school baseball coaches in the United States
High school football coaches in Kansas
The Hill School faculty
People from Scott County, Kansas
Players of American football from Kansas